Yujiulü Buluzhen (pinyin: Yùjiǔlǘ Bùlùzhēn) (died 414) was an early 5th century ruler of the Rouran, a confederation of nomadic tribes in Mongolia. His title is not known.

Rebellion 
Little is known about background of Buluzhen, except that he was a nephew to Yujiulü Hulü. He confronted Hulü who was about to oversee the marriage of one of his own daughters to Feng Ba in 414. Buluzhen told him that his daughter was still small and was about travel far away; as she may get sick with longing, it would be necessary to send the daughters of the nobleman, such as Shuli (樹黎) and Wudeyan (勿地延) with her. Hulü not agreeing with him, Buluzhen told Shuli and others that Hulü was thinking of giving their daughters as a dowry for his daughter to a distant, alien state. In the wake of news Shuli, among other noblemen, entered into a conspiracy with Buluzhen. Some warriors were set up behind the Hulü's yurts at night and arrested him with his daughter. As result, Yujiulü Buluzhen was set up as khagan, with Shuli (树黎) as chancellor.

Reign 
After ascending to throne, he sent Yujiulü Hulü and his daughter to Northern Yan. Feng Ba treated Hulü as an honored guest and, as originally planned, took Yujiulü's daughter as a concubine. Yujiulü Hulü requested that Feng Ba send an army to escort him home and, in May 414, Feng Ba, with some reluctance, gave him an escort commanded by general Wan Ling (萬陵) who, according to the account, returned after having killed Yujiulü Hulü along the way.

Back at Rouran, Buluzhen became involved in a love affair with a younger wife of Gaoche leader Chiluohou (叱洛侯). Chiluohou was an early supporter of Shelun who entrusted him with his son Sheba (社拔) . The younger wife revealed to Buluzhen that Chiluohou would support Datan against Buluzhen, as a sign of fidelity, sent him a golden rein. As a response, Buluzhen sent 8,000 cavalry against Chiluohou and burned all his properties while Chiluohou committed suicide. After this, Buluzhen attacked Datan hastily, however Datan came out victorious and strangled both Sheba and Buluzhen, eliminating both rivals and then declared himself khagan.

References 

 

Khagans of the Rouran
4th-century births
414 deaths
5th-century monarchs in Asia
Year of birth unknown
Place of birth unknown
Place of death unknown